Lunym is a rural locality (a settlement) in Verkhnestaritskoye Rural Settlement, Gaynsky District, Perm Krai, Russia. The population was 151 as of 2010. There are 6 streets.

Geography 
Lunym is located 46 km northeast of Gayny (the district's administrative centre) by road. Verkhnyaya Staritsa is the nearest rural locality.

References 

Rural localities in Gaynsky District